Matthew Ryan Sokol (born November 9, 1995) is an American football tight end for the New England Patriots of the National Football League (NFL). He played college football at Michigan State and began his career as undrafted free agent, landing his first roster spot in 2020 with the Los Angeles Chargers. Sokol signed with the Patriots in 2022.

Professional career

Los Angeles Chargers
Sokol signed with the Los Angeles Chargers as an undrafted free agent following the 2019 NFL Draft on April 27, 2019. He was waived during final roster cuts on August 31, 2019, and signed to the team's practice squad the next day. He was released on September 18, and re-signed to the practice squad on October 1. He was released again on October 9, 2019.

Jacksonville Jaguars
Sokol signed with the Jacksonville Jaguars' practice squad on November 18, 2019.

Detroit Lions
Sokol signed a reserve/future contract with the Detroit Lions on December 31, 2019. He was waived during final roster cuts on September 5, 2020, and signed to the team's practice squad on October 21, 2020. He was released three days later.

Los Angeles Chargers (second stint)
Sokol re-signed with the Los Angeles Chargers' practice squad on October 31, 2020. He was elevated to the active roster on December 26 for the team's week 16 game against the Denver Broncos, and reverted to the practice squad after the game. He was promoted to the active roster on January 1, 2021.

On August 31, 2021, Sokol was waived by the Chargers.

Jacksonville Jaguars (second stint)
Sokol re-signed with the Jacksonville Jaguars' practice squad on September 2, 2021.

Detroit Lions (second stint)
On January 12, 2022, Sokol signed a reserve/future contract with the Detroit Lions. He was waived on May 10, 2022.

New England Patriots
On May 11, 2022, Sokol was claimed off waivers by the New England Patriots. He was waived on August 30, 2022 and signed to the practice squad the next day. He signed a reserve/future contract on January 10, 2023.

References

External links
Los Angeles Chargers bio
Michigan State Spartans football bio

1995 births
Living people
People from Rochester, Michigan
Players of American football from Michigan
Sportspeople from Oakland County, Michigan
American football tight ends
Michigan State Spartans football players
Los Angeles Chargers players
Jacksonville Jaguars players
Detroit Lions players
New England Patriots players